Transformers: Prime (known as Transformers: Prime - Beast Hunters during its third and final season) is an American computer-animated television series based on the Transformers toy franchise by Hasbro that aired on the Hub Network from November 29, 2010, to July 26, 2013. The series focuses on the Autobots of "Team Prime", consisting of Optimus Prime, Ratchet, Arcee, Bumblebee and Bulkhead, and their human allies as they attempt to protect the Earth from the villainous Decepticons and their leader Megatron.

Development of the series began in early 2010 with the announcement that Alex Kurtzman and Roberto Orci, screenwriters of the first two live-action films, would be creating the series. Casting began soon after with the announcement that Peter Cullen and Frank Welker would reprise their roles as Optimus Prime and Megatron, respectively. The series concluded on October 4, 2013, with the television film Transformers Prime Beast Hunters: Predacons Rising. A standalone sequel series following Bumblebee and a new cast of characters, titled Transformers: Robots in Disguise, premiered on March 14, 2015.

Premise

Setting
Transformers Prime is set in the franchise's "Aligned" continuity, which also includes a number of contemporary books and video games like Transformers: Exodus, Transformers: War for Cybertron, Transformers: Fall of Cybertron, Transformers: Exiles, and Transformers: Retribution. The series is notably the first work within this continuity to not focus on the Autobots and the Decepticons' war on their home planet of Cybertron (though glimpses of it are shown in various flashbacks), and instead takes place primarily on Earth during modern times.

The series chronicles the adventures of an Autobot team known as "Team Prime" led by Optimus Prime and originally consisting of Arcee, Bumblebee, Bulkhead, Ratchet, and Cliffjumper (who is killed in the five-part pilot “Darkness Rising”). The team operates from a former American military missile silo near the fictional town of Jasper, Nevada, and tries to conceal their existence from humanity while continuing their fight against the Decepticons. The Autobots make several human allies throughout the series who agree to keep their secret, including high school students Jack Darby (and later his mother, nurse June Darby), Miko Nakadai, and Rafael Esquivel, and American government agent William Fowler. In the second half of the series, more Autobots join Team Prime, including Buklhead's friend and former teammate Wheeljack (who helped Team Prime several times during the first two seasons but did not officially join them until the third season), the ambitious rookie Smokescreen, and Optimus's chief lieutenant Ultra Magnus.

The Decepticons, led by Megatron and briefly by Starscream in the former's absence, operate from their warship, the Nemesis, and briefly from a base called Darkmount, which is built in the season two finale and then destroyed by the Autobots at the start of the third season. At first, Megatron, Starscream, and Soundwave (as well as his minion Laserbeak) are the only notable Decepticons, as they command a legion of identical drones called Vehicons. More Decepticons join the ranks over the course of the series, including the sadistic medic Knock Out, his partner Breakdown (who shares a rivalry with Bulkhead), Arcee's nemesis Airachnid, Insecticon hive leader Hardshell, Seeker captain Dreadwing, and Decepticon scientist Shockwave.

The series brings several notable changes and additions to Transformers lore. For example, both the Autobots and Decepticons use Ground Bridges (scaled-down versions of the Space Bridges, which also appear) to travel across the Earth, and the ancient planet-sized Transformer Unicron serves as the planet's core, emphasizing the idea of Earth and Cybertron being "twin planets". The series also marks the first appearance of the necromantic Dark Energon, a more unstable and dangerous version of Energon (the substance that powers all Transformers), which can be used to bring the dead back to life as mindless zombies (called "Terrorcons"). In the third season, Predacons (Transformers who resemble dragon-like creatures) are introduced as the Transformers' ancestors, having gone extinct until they were recreated by Shockwave to serve the Decepticons. Initially, only one Predacon is created, Predaking, who later goes independent from the Decepticons upon learning that Megatron had ordered the destruction of his unborn siblings. Two more Predacons, Skylynx and Darksteel, appear in Predacons Rising.

Synopsis

Season 1 
Season One opens with Cliffjumper being murdered by Starscream, who leads the Decepticons on Earth during Megatron's absence. Following Megatron's return, he uses Cliffjumper's corpse as a test subject for Dark Energon, which he intends to use to create an undead army from Cybertron’s fallen warriors. The plan fails when the Autobots destroy Megatron’s Space Bridge, leaving him in a comatose state floating in space, and allowing the treacherous Starscream to claim leadership of the Decepticons once more.

The rest of the season takes on a more episodic approach, with each episode focusing on Team Prime having to overcome a new enemy or threat, usually in the form of one of Starscream's schemes. However, some episodes feature other antagonists, such as Skyquake, an ancient Decepticon warrior who is awakened by Starscream to eliminate the Autobots, only to be killed by them; Makeshift, a shape-shifting Decepticon who impersonates Team Prime's ally Wheeljack to find their base (though he is killed before he can actually reveal its location to Starscream); M.E.C.H., a human organization led by the villainous Silas who seek Cybertronian technology for their ultimate goal of establishing a new world order; and Airachnid, Arcee's arch-enemy who killed her former partner Tailgate and pursues her own vendetta against the Autobots, but eventually joins the Decepticons' ranks. Knock Out and Breakdown also join the main Decepticon cast, establishing rivalries with Bumblebee and Bulkhead, respectively.

Eventually, Megatron recovers from his coma and reclaims leadership of the Decepticons from Starscream, who later defects to follow his own path and is replaced as Megatron's second-in-command by Airachnid. In the season one finale, the Earth starts to witness several natural disasters, later revealed to be caused by the awakening of Unicron. The Autobots and Megatron join forces to prevent the rise of Unicron, who is ultimately defeated after Optimus uses the Matrix of Leadership to knock him back into hibernation, at the expense of his memories. Regaining his pre-war personality of Orion Pax, he gets manipulated by Megatron into leaving the Autobots and joining the Decepticons.

Season 2 
In Season Two, Megatron manipulates the amnesiac Optimus into decrypting the Iacon archives, which contain the coordinates of Cybertronian relics hidden on Earth. Jack travels to Cybertron, obtaining Optimus’ memories from Vector Sigma, and restores them to Optimus via the Matrix. From this point onwards, most of the season revolves around the Autobots and Decepticons' hunt for the Iacon relics, with both factions retrieving a number of them. Starscream also searches for the relics and manages to beat the Autobots and the Decepticons to some of them.

This season introduces several new characters, such as Smokescreen, the newest member of Team Prime; Dreadwing, Skyquake's twin brother who seeks to avenge his death and becomes Megatron's new second-in-command; and Hardshell, leader of an Insecticon hive that is found by Airachnid and later comes under Megatron's service. Plotlines featured in this season include M.E.C.H. creating their own Cybertronian called Nemesis Prime; Airachnid killing Breakdown and defecting from the Decepticons to pursue revenge against Megatron, only to be captured by the Autobots; Hardshell being killed by Miko and Wheeljack in retaliation for hurting Bulkhead during the hunt for a Iacon relic; Silas being gravely injured and fused with Breakdown's body (becoming "Cy.L.A.S." Cybernetic Life Augmented by Symbiosis); and Megatron replacing his right forearm with that of a deceased Prime in order to wield the Forge of Solus Prime and create the Dark Star Saber, a dark counterpart to the Autobots' Star Saber.

Eventually, both the Autobots and the Decepticons learn about the Omega Keys, four Iacon relics used to power the Omega Lock, which can restore life to Cybertron. The Autobots manage to retrieve three of the keys, but Starscream steals them and gives them, along with the fourth key, to Megatron in return for clemency. Meanwhile, Dreadwing learns that Starscream resurrected Skyquake as a Terrorcon, thus desecrating his brother's honorable death, and becomes disillusioned with the Decepticon cause after Megatron allows Starscream to re-join their ranks. He steals the Forge and gives it to Team Prime before trying to exact revenge on Starscream, but is killed by Megatron. The Autobots use the Forge to transform their Ground Bridge into a Space Bridge, giving them the means to travel to Cybertron and find the Omega Lock. Optimus ultimately destroys the Omega Lock to prevent Megatron from using it to terraform the Earth, but not before the Decepticons use it to create a new base on Earth – Darkmount. The Decepticons then destroy the Autobots' base, unaware the team escaped beforehand using their Ground Bridge, though Optimus stays behind to destroy the bridge, in order to prevent the Decepticons from finding the others' whereabouts, and is seemingly killed.

Season 3 (Beast Hunters) 
The third season, subtitled Beast Hunters, opens with Team Prime divided and on the run from the Decepticons, while the severely damaged but still alive Optimus is being looked after by Smokescreen. New characters are again introduced, namely Ultra Magnus, Optimus's second-in-command and the leader of Bulkhead and Wheeljack's old team, and the coldly logical Decepticon scientist Shockwave, who plans to create an army of Predacons to serve Megatron, starting with Predaking. Eventually, Smokescreen is able to resurrect Optimus using the Forge's last powers after he dies, giving him a new, more powerful body, and the Autobots reunite, destroying Darkmount.

Despite this, the Decepticons remain an active threat, and Shockwave continues work on his Predacon army, until Megatron orders him to terminate it, pinning its destruction on the Autobots, after Predaking shows signs of intelligence and the ability to transform into a robot. During this time, Knock Out experiments on the captive Cy.L.A.S. with Dark Energon, inadvertently turning him into a Terrorcon that feeds on other Transformers' Energon and turns them into Terrorcons as well. He infects most of the Nemesis' crew before freeing Airachnid (who was retrieved by the Decepticons following the Autobot base's destruction), who puts him out of his misery and claims back leadership of the Insecticons. However, she is quickly dealt with by Soundwave, who teleports her and all the Insecticons to one of Cybertron's deserted moons. Later, Soundwave is ordered to kidnap Ratchet, whom Megatron forces to rebuild the Omega Lock using Synthetic Energon. During his imprisonment, Ratchet informs Predaking of the truth about his unborn siblings' destruction, and he defects, attempting to kill Megatron, but fails.

Eventually, the Autobots storm the Nemesis to rescue Ratchet and destroy the Omega Lock. During the battle, Soundwave is trapped in the Shadowzone (a parallel dimension created by the interaction of multiple Ground Bridges), and Bumblebee is mortally wounded by Megatron. However, he is resurrected after falling into a pool of Cybermatter, regaining his voice, and kills Megatron by impaling him with the Star Saber, sending his body falling back to Earth. Afterwards, the Autobots use the Omega Lock to restore Cybertron and head home victorious via the Nemesis, bidding farewell to their human allies and Ratchet, who chose to stay on Earth to continue helping humanity.

Predacons Rising 

The series concludes with a television film, Predacons Rising, in which the Autobots and most of the Decepticons work together to try and rebuild Cybertron. The Autobots also search for the fugitive Starscream and Shockwave, who plan to create an army of Predacons to exact their revenge on the Autobots. Meanwhile, Unicron reanimates and possesses Megatron's body, and with the power of Dark Energon at his fingertips, he seeks to kill Cybertron's core, which is actually his brother Primus, and eliminate all those who oppose him. To stop Unicron, the Autobots must form an uneasy alliance with Predaking and the first of Starscream and Shockwave's new Predacons, Skylynx and Darksteel.

Cast and characters

The series stars Optimus Prime (Peter Cullen), who acts as the leader of the Autobots. In his fight to protect the Earth, Optimus is aided by Team Prime, consisting of Ratchet (Jeffrey Combs), the team's medical officer, Bulkhead (Kevin Michael Richardson), the team's muscle, Arcee (Sumalee Montano), who is considered the team's most agile fighter, and Bumblebee (Will Friedle), the team's scout. Like in the live-action films, Bumblebee is voiceless throughout most of the series due to a damaged voice box and communicates through beeps. During the first season, the Autobots encounter Wheeljack (James Horan), one of Bulkhead's fellow Wreckers. While initially appearing for one episode in season one, the character plays a more important role and joins the team in the latter half of season two. During the same season, Smokescreen (Nolan North) is introduced as a new member of the team. In the final season, Ultra Magnus (Michael Ironside), Optimus's second-in-command, comes to Earth and also joins Team Prime.

Furthermore, the team is assisted by several humans; namely, Jack Darby (Josh Keaton), a high schooler who works at the local burger joint and bonds with Arcee and Smokescreen; Miko Nakadai (Tania Gunadi), a Japanese exchange student who bonds with Bulkhead and Wheeljack; Rafael "Raf" Esquivel (Andy Pessoa), a young programming genius who bonds with Bumblebee and Ratchet; June Darby (Markie Post), Jack's mother and a nurse at the local hospital; and Special Agent William Fowler (Ernie Hudson), a retired special forces officer and Team Prime's connection to the U.S. government.

The Decepticons are led by the villainous Megatron (Frank Welker), who is the main antagonist throughout the series. Initially, the only other notable Decepticons are Starscream (Steve Blum), Megatron's treacherous second-in-command who wishes to usurp him, and Soundwave (Frank Welker), the Decepticons' almost emotionless communication officer with an undying loyalty towards Megatron. This depiction of Soundwave remains silent in almost all of his appearances, and chooses to replicate other characters' voices to communicate. Later in the first season, Knock Out (Daran Norris), the Decepticons' medical officer, his partner Breakdown (Adam Baldwin), who shares a rivalry with Bulkhead, and Airachnid (Gina Torres), Arcee's nemesis, also join Megatron's ranks. The second season introduces Dreadwing (Tony Todd), a loyal Seeker commander who becomes Megatron's second-in-command during the season, and Shockwave (David Sobolov), the Decepticons' cold and logical scientist. Originally featured only in one flashback episode, Shockwave plays a bigger role in the third season, where he creates the Predacon Predaking (Peter Mensah) to serve Megatron.

Other notable characters are Leland "Silas" Bishop (Clancy Brown), a renegade military agent and leader of the terrorist group M.E.C.H. who serve as recurring antagonists throughout the first two seasons, and Unicron "the Chaos Bringer" (John Noble), the ancient enemy of the Transformers and their creator Primus, his brother, who serves as the core of Earth itself and the main antagonist of the season one finale and Predacons Rising. Unicron's "blood", Dark Energon, which can empower the Transformers or revive the dead with crippling side effects, is a recurring plot element in the series.

Production

Development
Alex Kurtzman and Roberto Orci, co-writers of Transformers and its sequel Revenge of the Fallen, were announced in early February to be helming a new Transformers series which would be CGI-animated. The title of the series was first announced in February 2010 as Transformers: Prime on Jeffrey Combs' website. Combs revealed he would be voicing Ratchet and that the first season would consist of 26 episodes. The series' logo was revealed on May 3, 2010. Orci said that one of the reasons he and Kurtzman decided to come back to the franchise is because when they worked on the live-action film, there were limitations on how much time the Transformers could appear on-screen and what type of actions they could perform, stating:There were things we wanted to do in the movies that we just couldn't do and there were character arcs that we wanted to explore with the Transformers that we just couldn't do. We wanted to show more of their mythology and their past and their planet and just hang out with them. ... And in the movie, every time you did that, it was very special but it was extremely limited. So there was always another way ... to tell ... Transformers stories and this was ... a lucky accident that .. we got an opportunity to pursue that inspiration[.]

On February 4, 2011, when the show's first season resumed airing, it was announced that it had been renewed for a second season consisting of 26 episodes like the first. The season began airing on February 18, 2012. On March 1, 2013, it was revealed that the third season of Transformers: Prime, which premiered a few weeks later on March 22, would be the show's last. During the same month, it was also announced that following the series finale, a TV movie called Transformers Prime Beast Hunters: Predacons Rising would air and would end the story. According to Hasbro Studios vice president Mike  Vogel, "[they] knew, from day one, where [they] were going to try to wrap everything up".

Writing
Discussing ideas about the show's themes and inspirations, Orci said that while the live-action film series was "about a boy and his cars", the dynamic between the kids and robots in Prime was to be more like that of The Iron Giant. In a similar statement, Josh Keaton (Jack Darby) revealed in a November 29, 2010, interview with The Trades that while the show does include human main characters, and their relationships with the Autobots are important, they are in the foreground. According to Jeff Kline, from the beginning they had created a story bible of at least "three years' worth of [storylines]" and that "the universal need to find or forge a family and a home" was one of the major themes when developing the series.

Kline said that from the early stages of development they wanted to keep the ensemble of characters small; this was done both for production reasons and to allow deeper characterization and development. Optimus Prime, Megatron and Bumblebee were the characters that were considered "must-haves" for the series. From that point on, they tried to include Autobots and Decepticons that complemented those characters' personalities, "rather than duplicate them".

Regarding Arcee's inclusion in the main cast, Orci said that he regretted killing her off in Transformers: Revenge of the Fallen and that Prime gave them "a chance to do what [they]’ve always wanted to do with her". Kline said the staff wanted to include more Decepticons than Autobots in the series, so that the Autobots would always be at a disadvantage and their jobs would be that much harder. Additionally, when asked about the death of Cliffjumper and other characters in the series, he said that "when we kill a character, we kill a character".

In an interview with MTV, Frank Welker (Megatron), when comparing Prime in the TV series to the original cartoon, said that the writers "go deeper into the evil side of [Megatron] and what’s driving him." In a different interview, Peter Cullen (Optimus Prime) said that "the writing is consistent with that of the original series, though in this new version [... my character] has a lot more communication with earthlings, and so he tries to be a little more Earthlike".

During New York Comic Con (NYCC) 2011, many details about season two were revealed. Regarding Optimus' memory loss and joining the Decepticons, Duane Capizzi said that they wanted to satisfy fans' expectations "but take it in unexpected directions. What happens will be pretty unexpected, but pretty organic." On the revelation that Unicron was sealed inside the Earth's core, Kline said that "[they] knew" they had to include him in the series but were initially unsure how. After a writer made the suggestion, they realized Unicron could be included in a way that tied Earth to Cybertron. He also reaffirmed his comment regarding death in the series, stating that "anyone can die" and revealed that "the body count has been upgraded" in season two.

During NYCC 2012, it was revealed that the show would be retitled to Transformers: Prime – Beast Hunters for its third season. In Beast Hunters, the Predacons and Predaking are introduced. By bringing Beasts into the show during the third season Kline said that this allowed them to  emphasize further how Earth and Cybertron are "brother, or twin, planets"; something they had earlier indicated with Unicron's arc in season one. He called the addition of beasts "fantastic" as it allowed them to keep shifting allegiances and "keep the [Autobots and Decepticons] out of balance".

Casting
The first voice actor to be cast in the series was Jeffrey Combs as Ratchet. Combs revealed this on his personal website on February 4, 2010. On May 17, 2010, it was announced that Peter Cullen, who had originated the role of Optimus Prime in the original series and voiced him in the live-action film series, would return as Optimus' voice in Prime. During San Diego Comic Con on July 8, 2010, it was revealed that Frank Welker would also reprise the role of Megatron from the original series. Besides Optimus and Ratchet, Autobots  Bumblebee, Arcee and Bulkhead were also announced. It was also revealed that Starscream and Soundwave would be part of the Decepticons.

On September 8, 2010, the show's voice actors were announced. Kline would later reveal that Hasbro Studios had placed high importance in getting Cullen and Frank Welker to reprise their roles as Optimus Prime and Megatron respectively. Steven Blum (Starscream) revealed in an interview that during recording of Transformers: Prime, he and the cast are given the scripts and "a couple of days [...] to figure out where the story is going". During New York Comic Con, 2011 it was announced that Tony Todd, who voiced The Fallen in Transformers: Revenge of the Fallen, would join the series in season two as Dreadwing.

According to Adam Baldwin, Breakdown's voice actor, the reason for his character being killed off and being let go from the show was due to "budget cuts".

Music
Music in the series was composed by Brian Tyler. Tyler stated that when he approached to perform the music for the series, they wanted it to be "cinematic, thematic [and feature] classic scores, similar to Star Wars." Live orchestras were used to create the music.

A soundtrack was released on March 6, 2012.

Broadcast and Release

United States 
In the United States, Transformers: Prime aired on Hasbro and Discovery Communications-owned television network, The Hub. The show began broadcasting on November 29, 2010, continuing to December 3, 2010. The rest of season one began to air on February 11, 2011. Reruns of the series began airing on The CW as part of the Vortexx block on December 8, 2012, making Prime the first Hasbro Studios animated production to appear on United States terrestrial television. The series was added to Kabillion in July 2019.

International 
On November 9, 2010, Hasbro Studios announced a broadcasting rights deal with Corus Entertainment in Canada, which included Transformers: Prime. The series premiered there on January 9, 2011, on Teletoon, half-owned by Corus. As a part of the deal between Hasbro Studios and Turner Broadcasting System Europe announced on December 13, 2010, Transformers: Prime began broadcasting in Central Europe, South Africa, and the Middle East on September 10, 2011, on the pan-European Cartoon Network.

In Singapore, MediaCorp has broadcasting rights for Hasbro Studios programs including Prime, with the English version airing on Okto. In Malaysia, Media Prima has broadcasting rights for Hasbro Studios programs including Prime; the series was broadcast on NTV7.
In India, the series premiered on Discovery Kids on May 6, 2013. The third season launched on October 19, 2014.
It was also released on Big Magic in February 2020.

Home media

In the United States and Canada, Shout! Factory has the home distribution rights to the series. The complete first season was first released on DVD and Blu-ray on March 6, 2012. The complete second season was first released on DVD on November 20, 2012, with the Blu-ray version being released seven days later. The third and final season, Beast Hunters, was released on December 3, 2013.

Reception

Ratings

The series attracted approximately 102,000 viewers per episode.

The Transformers: Prime/G.I. Joe Renegades special programming block on Friday from 3:30 p.m.–7;00 p.m. generated significant household and key audiences over the previous week. "[Households] (+111%, 97,000); Persons [age] 2+ (+133%, 142,000); Kids [ages] 2-11 (+130%, 62,000); Kids 6-11 (+78%, 32,000); Adults 18-49 (+117%, 50,000) and Women 18-49 (+120%, 11,000)."

Critical response
Dusty Stower of Screen Rant, placed Transformers: Prime as the sixth best Transformers cartoon. Stower described the first season as "a very slow burn, [with] its eventual payoff [being] incredibly anticlimactic" and that in their attempt to focus on the Transformers' mythology, the writers "forgot to craft three-dimensional, likable characters". However, he concluded that the show did live up to its promise of an epic tale late in its run and reacted positively to Primes portrayal of Ratchet and Starscream.

Eric Goldman of IGN gave season one a "great" 8.0 out of 10. He praised the show for creating fully formed, relatable characters, well-done action sequences, serious-minded storylines and voice acting, singling out Peter Cullen (Optimus Prime), Jeffrey Combs (Ratchet) and Frank Welker's (Megatron) performances. He criticized Bumblebee's portrayal as mute. He concluded the review saying that the series "accomplishes its goals, delivering plenty of fun and action, while also incorporating darker and more complex moments that older viewers can appreciate".

Brian Lowry of Variety said that Transformers: Prime is "unexpectedly sharp" and better than the movies, adding that the show's CGI animation is well-suited for rendering shiny robots and "their vehicular alter egos"; he ended the review by saying that while "there's nothing more than meets the eye here, [..] what does appear is plenty entertaining".

Accolades

Marketing, merchandise and other media
Hasbro had the Toys "R" Us store located in Times Square, New York City to cover the whole exterior of the store in Transformers: Prime characters' images.  Several billboards were rented. One even appeared on Broadway in New York City. Additional advertisements were run on the back cover of DC Comics’ Justice League of America Issue #51.
A giant statue of Optimus Prime (modeled after his Transformers: Prime design) was shown off at San Diego Comic Con 2010.
The statue was later moved to the location of New York Comic Con 2011 convention, where Hasbro was exhibiting.

Toy line
The official launch date of the toy line was December 1, 2011. The release date of July 2011 was incorrectly stated during BotCon 2011, but the December 1, 2011, date was later confirmed by the Hasbro Brand Team. Although earlier sources stated that the line would launch on October 1, 2011, or October 11, 2011.

Mobile media
Ruckus Mobile Media partnered with Hasbro to deliver Transformers: Prime innovative storybook apps for Android, and iOS (iPad, iPhone, iPod Touch) systems. The app was meant to deliver immersive reading experiences with interactive storytelling including title specific activities, coloring and read-and-record functions. The app was slated to release in May 2011, but never came out.

Books

IDW Publishing has released a group of comic books based on Transformers: Prime. A comic book prequel was released on October 13, 2010, in the United States, followed by an October 26, 2010, Canadian release date. Adaptations of episodes (usually two episodes per comic book) from the series are currently being released, similar to the Transformers Animated comic books. Some Transformers: Prime storybooks were released in April, August and September 2012, in the UK including Transformers Prime: Official Handbook and Transformers Prime: Meet the Team.

IDW has also published Transformers. Prime: Rage of the Dinobots and Transformers Prime: Beast Hunters, two comic book tie-ins that link the cartoon and the video games developed by High Moon Studios.

Video game

A video game developed by Nowpro and Altron distributed by Activision was released in October 2012. The game, titled Transformers: Prime – The Game, is a brawler available for Wii, Nintendo DS, Nintendo 3DS, and Wii U. Both the 3DS and Wii U versions of the game received mixed critical reviews.

Sequel

A sequel called Transformers: Robots in Disguise debuted in March 2015. The series features Bumblebee as a police officer and follows his adventures on Earth, trying to catch escaped Decepticon prisoners. The series introduces a new cast of characters who help Bumblebee in his mission, including Strongarm, Sideswipe, Grimlock, Fixit, and the humans Denny Clay and his son Russell. Optimus Prime appears in a recurring capacity during the first season as a spirit, before being resurrected in the finale and joining the main cast from season two onwards. The only other characters to return from Transformers: Prime are Ratchet, Bulkhead, Soundwave, and Starscream. Robots in Disguise is much more light-hearted in tone than its predecessor and received an overall mixed reception.

Notes

References

External links

  at TV Aichi 
 

Prime
2010s American animated television series
2010 American television series debuts
2013 American television series endings
2010s American science fiction television series
Television series by Hasbro Studios
American computer-animated television series
Cartoon Network original programming
Works by Alex Kurtzman and Roberto Orci
English-language television shows
Television shows set in the United States
Television shows set in Nevada
Japan in non-Japanese culture
American children's animated action television series
American children's animated space adventure television series
American children's animated science fantasy television series
American children's animated superhero television series
Treasure hunt television series
Discovery Family original programming
Anime-influenced Western animated television series
Robot superheroes